Choice Digital was the digital variant of London radio station Choice FM, which could previously be heard via DAB Digital Radio in many locations around the UK and on Sky Digital channel 0114 and online at its website.

In October 2013, this station ceased to exist and was replaced with the national DAB station Capital Xtra.

DAB digital radio multiplexes 
DRG London (Greater London)
MXR North East (North East England)
MXR North West (North West England)
MXR Severn Estuary (South Wales and West of England)
MXR West Midlands (West Midlands)
MXR Yorkshire (Yorkshire)

See also
Choice FM
List of radio stations in the United Kingdom

GCap Media
Local mass media in London
Urban contemporary radio stations